Akhundzada is a surname. Notable people with the name include:

 Amir Muhammad Akhundzada, Afghan politician
 Hibatullah Akhundzada (born 1961), leader of Afghan Taliban
 Mohammad Nasim Akhundzada (died 1990), mujahideen commander in Helmand Province, Afghanistan
 Sher Mohammad Akhundzada, Governor of Helmand Province, Afghanistan

See also
 Akhundzade - Azerbaijani surname
 Akhundzadeh - a village

Surnames of Afghan origin